Cold War liberal is a term that was used in the United States during the Cold War, which began after the end of World War II. The term was used to describe liberal politicians and labor union leaders who supported democracy and equality. They supported the growth of labor unions, the Civil Rights Movement, and the War on Poverty and simultaneously opposing totalitarianism such as Communist rule. Cold War liberals supported efforts to contain Soviet communism.

Liberalism during the Cold War
American liberalism of the Cold War era was the immediate heir to Franklin Roosevelt's New Deal and the slightly more distant heir to the Progressives of the early 20th century. Sol Stern wrote, "Cold War liberalism deserves credit for the greatest American achievement since World War II—winning the Cold War." The essential tenets of Cold War liberalism can be found in Roosevelt's Four Freedoms (1941): of these, freedom of speech and of religion were classic liberal freedoms, as was "freedom from fear" (freedom from tyrannical government), but "freedom from want" was another matter. Roosevelt proposed a notion of freedom that went beyond government non-interference in private lives. "Freedom from want" could justify positive government action to meet economic needs, a concept more associated with the concepts of Abraham Lincoln's Republican Party, Henry Clay's Whig Party, and Alexander Hamilton's economic principles of government intervention and subsidy than the more radical socialism and social democracy of European thinkers, or with prior versions of classical liberalism as represented by Thomas Jefferson's Democratic-Republican and Andrew Jackson's Democratic Party.

In the 1950s and the 1960s, both major American political parties included liberal and conservative factions. The Democratic Party had two wings: Northern and Western liberals opposed the generally-conservative Southern whites. Difficult to classify were the northern urban Democratic "political machines." They had supported New Deal economic policies but would slowly come apart over racial issues. Some historians have divided the Republican Party into the liberal Wall Street and the conservative Main Street factions; others have noted that the GOP's conservatives came from landlocked states (Robert A. Taft of Ohio and Barry Goldwater of Arizona) and the liberals tended to come from California (Earl Warren and Pete McCloskey), New York (Nelson Rockefeller), and other coastal states.

Opposing both communism and conservatism, Cold War liberalism resembled earlier "liberalisms" in its views on many social issues and personal liberty, but its economic views were not those of free-market Jeffersonian liberalism or those of European social democrats. Although they never endorsed state socialism, they called for spending on education, science, and infrastructure, notably the expansion of NASA and the construction of the Interstate Highway System. Their progressive ideas continued the legacy of Lincoln, Woodrow Wilson, Theodore Roosevelt, and Franklin Roosevelt.

Most prominent and constant among the positions of Cold War liberalism were:
 Support for a domestic economy built on a balance of power between labor (in the form of organized unions) and management (with a tendency to be more interested in large corporations than in small business).
 A foreign policy focused on containing the Soviet Union and its allies, one factor leading to its dissolution at the end of 1991.
 The continuation and expansion of New Deal social welfare programs (in the broad sense of welfare, including programs such as Social Security).
 An embrace of Keynesian economics. By way of compromise with political groupings to their right, this often became in practice military Keynesianism.

At first, liberals generally did not see Franklin Roosevelt's successor, Harry Truman, as one of their own and viewed him as a Democratic Party hack. However, liberal politicians and liberal organizations such as the Americans for Democratic Action (ADA) sided with Truman in opposing communism both at home and abroad, sometimes by sacrificing civil liberties. The ADA, however, succeeded in pushing Truman leftward on issues such as civil rights. Hubert Humphrey was a liberal leader who fought to uphold Truman's veto of the McCarran Act of 1950.

Liberals were united in their opposition to McCarthyism. President Truman would call McCarthy "the greatest asset the Kremlin has" by "torpedo[ing] the bipartisan foreign policy of the United States."

The Truman Doctrine was an American foreign policy with the primary goal of containing Soviet expansion during the Cold War.

John F. Kennedy 
John F. Kennedy is regarded by some as one of the key players that revived liberalism and was the most influential liberal of the time. During his campaign, Kennedy took the liberal approach by promising voters to revive liberalism, which had withered under President Dwight D. Eisenhower, with a new set of reforms collectively called the New Frontier. The young president wanted to expand Social Security to benefit more Americans, help the elderly pay their medical costs, fund educational endeavors, raise the national minimum wage, and reduce income inequality. In his famous inaugural address, Kennedy appealed to American youth by instructing them to "ask not what your country can do for you; ask what you can do for your country."

He later launched the Peace Corps to support this effort, encouraging young Americans to assist people in developing countries. Kennedy also responded to national fears and pressures regarding the Space Race against the Soviet Union by challenging Americans to put a man on the moon by the end of the decade. His enthusiasm spread across the country. He sought to reform economic issues along with issues of the Humanities which is what paved the way for the future of liberalism

To improve relations with Latin America and guard against pro-Soviet regimes, JFK supported the Alliance for Progress, which over 10 years provided billions of dollars in foreign aid to Latin American countries, encouraging economic cooperation and aiming to reduce economic inequality in those countries as well through land reform. The alliance succeeded in some of its goals but faced limitations in its political goals.

Notable Cold War liberals 
Some notable pioneers of Cold War liberalism included Harry S. Truman, John F. Kennedy, and Lyndon B. Johnson. World War II ended under Truman. Johnson succeeded to the presidency after the assassination of Kennedy. Johnson was greatly supported by the Democratic Party, and as president, he was responsible for designing the Great Society legislation for civil rights, public broadcasting, Medicare, Medicaid, environmental protection, aid to education, and his War on Poverty. Johnson was renowned for his domineering personality and the "Johnson treatment," his coercion of powerful politicians in order to advance legislation. All of his accomplishments were influenced by the idea of Cold War liberalism which was according to most, implemented by JFK.

Henry Martin "Scoop" Jackson, first a representative and then senator from Washington State, is also widely recognized as a Cold War liberal. A Democrat, his political beliefs were characterized by support of civil rights, human rights, and safeguarding the environment, but he had an equally-strong commitment to oppose totalitarianism in general, particularly communism. Jackson and his legacy are acknowledged as having significant influence on neoconservatism.

Zbigniew Brzezinski, Jimmy Carter's National Security Adviser, was a liberal Democrat and a committed anti-communist, favoring social justice while seeing world events in substantially Cold War terms. Additionally, according to Foreign Policy, "Brzezinski’s outlook was anti-Soviet, but he also insisted, like George Kennan before him, on the necessity of cultivating a strong West."

Cold War liberalism and conservatism
In the 1970s, Richard Nixon, Gerald Ford, and Jimmy Carter pursued a relative reduction of Cold War tensions through linkage policy and triangular diplomacy, while continuing to pressure the Soviet Union in key areas. The Carter Doctrine, which sought to oppose Soviet expansion toward the Persian Gulf, was expanded and altered by the "Reagan Corollary". Reagan believed that the United States should combat communism more directly with the Reagan Doctrine. He regarded the previous detentes a sign of vulnerability. In 1991, two years after Reagan left office, the Cold War ended. His policies of preserving peace through strength and promoting advancement of democracy around the world had gained him significant foreign policy credibility. The conservative Reagan supported liberal democracy as a system compared to the authoritarian Soviet system, and his policies supported a "grand strategy" consistent with pressuring the Soviet Union.

See also
 Liberal hawk
 Liberal internationalism

Notes

References
Faulks, Keith. Political sociology: a critical introduction. Edinburgh: Edinburgh University Press, 1999.
 Fernbach, Alfred and Bishko, Charles Julian, Charting Democracy in America (1995)
Frost, Bryan-Paul and Sikkenga, Jeffrey (2003). History of American Political Thought. Lexington Books. p. 33.
Hamby, Alonzo L., Liberalism and Its Challengers: From F.D.R. to Bush (1992)

Schlesinger, Arthur, "Liberalism in America: A Note for Europeans", in The Politics of Hope, (1962)

Cold War
Cold War terminology
Political history of the United States
Political terminology of the United States